Mercedes Paz and Tine Scheuer-Larsen were the defending champions but only Paz competed that year with Manon Bollegraf.

Bollegraf and Paz won in the final 6–1, 6–2 against Carin Bakkum and Simone Schilder.

Seeds
Champion seeds are indicated in bold text while text in italics indicates the round in which those seeds were eliminated.

 Manon Bollegraf /  Mercedes Paz (champions)
 Carin Bakkum /  Simone Schilder (final)
 Nathalie Herreman /  Sandra Wasserman (semifinals)
 Neige Dias /  Silvia La Fratta (first round)

Draw

External links
 1989 Belgian Open Doubles Draw

Belgian Open (tennis)
1989 WTA Tour